Nuala is an Irish female given name, derived from Irish mythology - being either a diminutive form of Fionnuala ("fair shoulder"), the daughter of Lir, or an alternate name for Úna (perhaps meaning "lamb"), wife of Finvarra, king of the fairies.

People of this name include:

People
 St Nuala Irish Saint
 Nuala Ahern (born 1949), Irish politician
 Nuala Archer (born 1955), Irish American poet
 Nuala Carey, Irish weather presenter 
 Nuala Fennell (1935–2009), Irish economist and politician
 Nuala Hafner (born 1976), Australian media personality
 Nuala Holloway, Irish artist, model and actress
 Nuala McAllister, Northern Irish politician
 Nuala McGovern, Irish journalist, working for BBC News
 Nuala McKeever, Northern Irish comic actress
 Nuala Ní Chonchúir (born 1970), Irish writer and poet
 Nuala Ní Conchobair (died 1226), Queen of Ulaid
 Nuala Ní Dhomhnaill (born 1952), Irish poet
 Nuala O'Donnell, 17th century Irish figure who took part in the Flight of the Earls
 Nuala O'Faolain (1940–2008), Irish journalist and author
 Nuala O'Loan DBE, Northern Irish public figure
 Nuala Quinn-Barton Irish model, artist and film producer
 Nuala Woulfe, Irish writer

Characters
 Nuala Anne McGrail, the title character of the mystery novel series of the same name created by Andrew M. Greeley
Nuala, a character in the comic book series, The Sandman
Princess Nuala, a character in the film Hellboy II: The Golden Army
Nuala Magee, a character in the novel Touch Me by James Moloney
Nuala, a character in Margaret Atwood's novel The Year of the Flood
Nuala, twin to Cerridwen in the series A Court of Thorns and Roses by Sarah J Maas
Nuala the Selkie, a character in the film The Secret of Roan Inish
Nuala “Nunu” Carney, a character in The Ferryman, a play by Jez Butterworth
Nuala, a character in The Missing Sister, a book by Lucinda Riley
Nuala, a character in the film Eyes Wide Shut

See also

 Fenella (disambiguation)

Irish-language feminine given names